Baraha may refer to:

Baraha, word processing software for Indian languages
Baraha, Bheri, a village in western-central Nepal
Baraha, Sagarmatha, a village in south-eastern Nepal
Saadat-e-Bara or Baraha, a community of Sayyids in Uttar Pradesh, India